NFL Top 100 Players of 2022 is the twelfth season in the NFL Top 100 series. It premiered on August 14, 2022 and concluded on August 28, 2022. Tampa Bay Buccaneers quarterback Tom Brady number one player for the fourth time.

Episode list

The list

Sources 

 2022 Pro Bowl rosters:
 2021 All-Pro Team:
 PFWA All-Rookie Team:

Reception 
Andrew Whitworth, former Tackle for the Los Angeles Rams, criticized the list and its voting process, calling it a "joke" and "content filler". Kyle Shanahan, coach of the San Francisco 49ers, said that he doesn't pay attention to it. Myles Garrett, All-Pro defensive end for the Cleveland Browns, said that he should be ranked first, but also noted that he does not vote.

References 

National Football League trophies and awards
National Football League records and achievements
National Football League lists